Louis Benjamin Heller (February 10, 1905 – October 30, 1993) was an American lawyer and politician who served three terms as a U.S. congressman from New York from 1949 to 1954.

Life
He was born on February 10, 1905, on the Lower East Side in Manhattan. Heller was the second of four children of Max and Dora Heller. His parents had emigrated from Romania just a few years before the birth of their first child, a daughter named Freida.

Louis B. Heller graduated from Fordham Law School in 1926. He served as a special deputy assistant attorney general for cases of election fraud from 1936 until 1946. He was an appeal agent with the United States Selective Service from 1941 until 1942.

State legislature 
He was a member of the New York State Senate (7th D.) in 1943 and 1944.

Congress 
He was elected as a Democrat to the 81st United States Congress, to fill the vacancy caused by the death of John J. Delaney, and was re-elected to the 82nd and 83rd United States Congresses, holding office from February 15, 1949, until his resignation on July 21, 1954.

Judicial post 
Heller resigned from Congress to become a Judge of New York City's Special Sessions Court, where he served until 1958.  In December 1958 he was elected Justice of New York City's City Court, and he served until August 1966.  He was elected to the New York Supreme Court in 1966 and served until his 1977 retirement.

Death 
He died on October 30, 1993, in Plantation, Florida. He was buried at Washington Cemetery in Brooklyn.

See also
List of Jewish members of the United States Congress

References

Sources

Fordham University School of Law alumni
1905 births
1993 deaths
American people of Romanian-Jewish descent
Jewish members of the United States House of Representatives
People from Plantation, Florida
Democratic Party New York (state) state senators
New York Supreme Court Justices
Democratic Party members of the United States House of Representatives from New York (state)
Burials in New York (state)
20th-century American politicians
20th-century American judges
20th-century American Jews